Morgh Mohsen-e Tai (also Romanized as Morgh Moḩsen-e Tā’ī; also known as Margh-e Moḩsen Ţalā’ī, Morgh Moḩsen, and Tā’ī) is a village in Miyankuh-e Sharqi Rural District, Mamulan District, Pol-e Dokhtar County, Lorestan Province, Iran. At the 2006 census, its population was 120, in 23 families.

References 

Towns and villages in Pol-e Dokhtar County